The 1934 Washington Huskies football team was an American football team that represented the University of Washington during the 1934 college football season. In its fifth season under head coach Jimmy Phelan, the team compiled a 6–1–1 record, finished in third place in the Pacific Coast Conference, and outscored all opponents by a combined total of 104 to 51. Woodrow Ullin was the team captain.

Schedule

References

Washington
Washington Huskies football seasons
Washington Huskies football